Mareva Georges is a French model who served as Miss Tahiti 1990 and Miss France 1991.

Early life
Georges father is German and her mother is of Tahitian/Rarotonga and American descent. She is the niece of Edna Tepava, who was Miss Tahiti 1973 and Miss France 1974. She was raised in Punaauia, Tahiti and began her career as a model. She won the Miss Tahiti pageant in 1990 which qualified her to run for Miss France which she won in 1991.

Personal life
In 2016, she married Guess? Inc. co-founder Paul Marciano in Bora Bora. They have two children, Ryan (born 2006) and Gia (born 2012). The couple lives in Los Angeles.

Advocacy
Today she works as an advocate for the protection of children and women from abuse. In 2016 she donated over $20,000 to Republican candidates including a donation of $2,700 (the maximum amount allowed by federal law) to Donald Trump.

References

External links
Mareva Georges Marciano

 official website

Living people
French Polynesian people of German descent
French Polynesian people of American descent
French people of German descent
French people of American descent
Tahitian women
1969 births
Miss France winners
California Republicans
Miss Universe 1991 contestants
Miss World 1991 delegates